Nathan Phillips (born 13 March 1980) is an Australian actor.

Life and career

His professional acting career began in 1999, with a role on the popular Australian soap opera Neighbours. His television career was later followed by roles in Child Star: The Shirley Temple Story, Blue Heelers, Something in the Air and The Saddle Club.

In 2002, he made his feature film debut with a role in Warriors of Virtue: The Return to Tao (also starring Kevin Smith, Shedrack Anderson III and Nina Liu). His next role, the lead in Australian Rules, earned him a nomination for the Film Critics Circle of Australia's Best Actor award, alongside David Gulpilil, Guy Pearce and Vince Colosimo.

Phillips's film career has seen him star in both Australian productions, such as Take Away (with Rose Byrne), One Perfect Day (with Abbie Cornish) and Under the Radar, and Hollywood productions such as Chernobyl Diaries, Redline and Surfer, Dude and most notably Snakes on a Plane. He is perhaps most known for his role as backpacker Ben Mitchell in 2005's, hit horror film Wolf Creek. After the success of this film, Phillips moved to Los Angeles, where he was based for several years.

Although tipped for big things in Hollywood after the success of Wolf Creek, Phillips chose to go travelling for long periods of time, rather than focus on his career as an actor. Phillips' career has, to date, consisted mostly of roles in low budget films, and television work, such as his role as Tom Wills, Australia's first significant cricketer and father of Australian rules football. In 2020 Phillips appeared in the Nine Networks Halifax Retribution.

From 2019 on, Phillips is back living in his native Australia, and working on television and film projects there. In addition to acting, Phillips was producer on 2019's Blood Vessel.

Filmography

Awards
 Nominated: 2001 Film Critics Circle of Australia: Best Actor (Australian Rules).

References

External links
 

Australian male film actors
Australian male television actors
Living people
Male actors from Melbourne
21st-century Australian male actors
1980 births
People from Sunbury, Victoria